Longmont is a center of media in north-central Colorado. The following is a list of media outlets based in the city.

Print

Newspapers
The Longmont Leader is the local, daily newspaper.

The Longmont Times-Call while bearing the city's name is published from Boulder and is operated by Alden Global Capital of New York City.

Radio
Longmont is in the Denver-Boulder radio market. Local listeners can also receive the signal of radio stations broadcasting from nearby communities including Centennial, Fort Collins, Greeley, Greenwood Village, and Loveland.

The following is a list of radio stations that broadcast from and/or are licensed to Longmont.

AM

FM

Television
Longmont is in the Denver television market. In addition, local viewers can receive the signal of television stations broadcasting from nearby communities including Fort Collins and Greeley.

The following is a list of television stations that broadcast from and/or are licensed to Longmont.

References

Longmont